Padawa is a village on the northwestern coast of Maré Island, in the Loyalty Islands of New Caledonia. It lies southwest by road from Hnawayaca and north of Nece.

References

Populated places in Maré Island